Joseph Richardson House, also known as the Langhorne Community Memorial Building, is a historic home located in Langhorne, Bucks County, Pennsylvania. It was built in 1738, and is a -story, stuccoed stone dwelling with a gable roof.  It has an original -story, gambrel roofed stone addition.  It is one of the oldest structures in Bucks County and was home to the Richardson family from its construction into the 20th century. In 1919, the Richardson family sold the home and it was acquired as a memorial to those who served in World War I.

It was added to the National Register of Historic Places in 1985.  It is located in the Langhorne Historic District, listed in 1987.

References

External links

 Joseph Richardson House, Bellevue & Maple Avenues, Langhorne, Bucks County, PA: 10 photos, 2 data pages, and 1 photo caption page at Historic American Buildings Survey
 Historic Langhorne Association website: Richardson House

Historic American Buildings Survey in Pennsylvania
Houses on the National Register of Historic Places in Pennsylvania
Houses completed in 1738
Houses in Bucks County, Pennsylvania
Historic district contributing properties in Pennsylvania
National Register of Historic Places in Bucks County, Pennsylvania